Four One Five Two is the debut album of Chicago Illinois's Sundowner, the acoustic side-project from Chris McCaughan, singer guitarist of The Lawrence Arms. The album was released on March 13, 2007, after many months of playing coffee shops and touring alongside The Lawrence Arms.

The album consists of twelve songs, ten of which were previously unreleased in any form and two of which (My Boatless Booze Cruise, One Hundred Resolutions) are remakes of Lawrence Arms songs.

The album takes its name from McCaughan's childhood home address. Its cover artwork was designed by artist Heather Hannoura, best known for designing merchandise for many punk rock bands, including Green Day, Alkaline Trio, AFI, and Rancid.

Track listing
"Steal Your Words" – 2:16
"This War Is Noise" – 2:49
"The Sea of Lights" – 2:37
"Traffic Haze" – 2:50
"Midsummer Classic" – 3:46
"My Boatless Booze Cruise" - 3:10
"Your Self Portrait" – 2:07
"Jackson Underground" – 3:20
"Endless Miles" – 4:21
"Cold White North" – 2:35
"One Hundred Resolutions" – 4:29
"Audio Geography" – 3:11

 While the album has no singles, a video for "This War Is Noise" was posted on YouTube, directed by Brendan Kelly (fellow Lawrence Arms member).

Personnel
 Chris McCaughan (vocals, acoustic guitars)
 Jenny Choi (cello, piano, background vocals)
 Neil Hennessy (acoustic bass)

External links
 This War Is Noise video.
 My Boatless Booze Cruise live video.
 Sea of Lights live video.
 Review of the album by Constantine Koutsoutis.
 Sundowner on Myspace

2007 debut albums
Red Scare Industries albums